Chilabad may refer to:
 Chilabad, Kerman
 Chilabad, alternate name of Khorramabad, Arzuiyeh, Kerman Province